The Hawk GafHawk ("General Aviation Freighter") was a small, turboprop-powered freighter aircraft developed in the United States in the 1980s but which only flew in prototype form. It was designed by Hawk International as a means of transporting drilling equipment in and out of remote locations, and was designed to be simple, rugged, and have good STOL and rough-field performance. The resulting design was a boxy aircraft with a rectangular-section fuselage with a high-set tail and rear loading ramp. The high aspect-ratio wings were high-set and braced with struts. The landing gear was fixed and of tricycle configuration, with the main units having dual wheels.

Certification proved elusive, however, and Hawk eventually abandoned the project without building any other examples.

Variants
 GafHawk 125 - prototype and intended production version (1 built)
 GafHawk 950 - enlarged version (not built)
 TurboHawk 85 - twin-engine version (not built)

Specifications

References

External links
Exhaustive information and documentation about the GAFHawk project, with many photos.
Photo of the surviving prototype at AirHistory.net

1980s United States cargo aircraft
High-wing aircraft
Single-engined turboprop aircraft
Aircraft first flown in 1982